KQGC (91.1 MHz) was a radio station in the Albuquerque, New Mexico, market signing on in Spring 2006. It was licensed to Belen, New Mexico, south of Albuquerque. It was also last owned by Carlos Arana, through licensee Carlos Arana Ministries, Inc., and broadcasts Spanish-Christian radio network Radio Nueva Vida. Prior to November 2010, the station aired the "God's Country Radio Network" Positive Country format. This station, however, had a weak signal in Albuquerque.

Educational Media Foundation had filed an application with the FCC to move Santa Febased KSFR to Sandia Crest at 20,000 watts. Originally at 90.7 FM, EMF also filed on July 19, 2007 to move the station to 91.1 FM with changes to power and antenna height.

The Federal Communications Commission cancelled KQGC's license on May 19, 2021, due to the station having been silent for more than twelve months.

External links
Official Website

QGC
Radio stations established in 2002
2002 establishments in New Mexico
2021 disestablishments in New Mexico
Radio stations disestablished in 2021
Defunct radio stations in the United States
Defunct religious radio stations in the United States
QGC